This is a list of all participating squads of the 1996 Women's Olympic Volleyball Tournament, organised by the world's governing body, the FIVB in conjunction with the International Olympic Committee. It was held from July 20 to August 3, 1996 in the Stegeman Coliseum and the Omni Coliseum of The University of Georgia in Atlanta, Georgia (United States).

Squads

Ana Ida Alvares 
Leila Barros 
Ericleia Bodziak 
Hilma Caldeira 
Ana Paula Connelly 
Marcia Fu Cunha 
Virna Dias 
Ana Moser 
Ana Flavia Sanglard (c)
Hélia Souza 
Sandra Suruagy 
Fernanda Venturini
Head coach:Bernardo Rezende

Kerri Buchberger 
Josee Corbeil 
Wanda Guenette 
Janis Kelly 
Lori Ann Mundt 
Diane Ratnik 
Erminia Russo 
Michelle Sawatzky 
Brigitte Soucy 
Christine Stark 
Kathy Tough (c)
Katrina Von Sass
Head coach:Mike Burchuk

Cui Yongmei 
He Qi 
Lai Yawen (c)
Li Yan 
Liu Xiaoning 
Pan Wenli 
Sun Yue 
Wang Lina 
Wang Yi 
Wang Ziling 
Wu Yongmei 
Zhu Yunying
Head coach:Lang Ping

Taimarys Aguero 
Regla Bell 
Magalys Carvajal 
Marlenys Costa 
Ana Fernández 
Mirka Francia 
Idalmis Gato 
Lilia Izquierdo 
Mireya Luis 
Raisa O'Farril 
Yumilka Ruíz 
Regla Torres
Head coach:Eugenio George Lafita

Nancy Celis
Tanja Hart
Karin Horninger
Silvia Roll
Susanne Lahme
Grit Naumann
Hanka Pachale
Ines Pianka (c)
Constanze Radfan
Christine Schultz
Ute Steppin
Claudia Wilke
Head coach:Siegfried Köhler

Kayo Hoshino 
Aki Nagatomi
Kazumi Nakamura
Chieko Nakanishi (c)
Motoko Obayashi 
Ikumi Ogake 
Mika Saiki 
Kiyomi Sakamoto 
Asako Tajimi 
Chiho Torii 
Mika Yamauchi 
Tomoko Yoshihara
Head coach:Kuniaki Yoshida

Cintha Boersma (c)
 Erna Brinkman
 Riëtte Fledderus
 Jerine Fleurke
 Marjolein de Jong
 Saskia van Hintum
 Marrit Leenstra
 Elles Leferink 
 Irena Machovcak 
 Claudia van Thiel
 Ingrid Visser
 Henriëtte Weersing
Head coach:Bert Goedkoop

Luren Baylon 
Milagros Camere (c)
Leyla Chihuán 
Verónica Contreras 
Yolanda Delgado 
Iris Falcón 
Sara Joya 
Sandra Rodríguez 
Milagros Moy 
Paola Ramos 
Marjorie Vilchez 
Yulissa Zamudio
Head coach:Park Jong-Dug

Head coach: Nikolay Karpol

Chang So-yun 
Chang Yoon-hee (c)
Choi Kwang-hee 
Chung Sun-hye 
Eoh Yeon-soon 
Hong Ji-yeon 
Kang Hye-mi 
Kim Nam-sun 
Lee In-sook 
Lee Soo-jung 
Park Soo-jeong 
Yoo Yin-kyung
Head coach:Kim Cheol-yong

Tara Cross-Battle (c)
 Lori Endicott
 Caren Kemner
 Kristin Klein
 Beverly Oden
 Elaina Oden 
 Danielle Scott 
 Tammy June Webb
 Paula Weishoff
 Tonya Williams
 Elaine Youngs
 Yoko Zetterlund
Head coach:Terry Liskevych

Nataliya Bozhenova (c)

Olexandra Fomina
Tetyana Ivanyushkyna
Olga Kolomiyets
Alla Kravets
Olena Kryvonossova
Vita Mateshik
Regina Mylosserdova

Mariya Polyakova
Olena Sydorenko
Head coach:Gariy Iegiazarov

References

External links
 Volleyball Almanac
 Official Report
 Squads

1996
S
 
1996 in women's volleyball
Vol